Two human polls comprised the 1973 National Collegiate Athletic Association (NCAA) Division I football rankings. Unlike most sports, college football's governing body, the NCAA, does not bestow a national championship, instead that title is bestowed by one or more different polling agencies. There are two main weekly polls that begin in the preseason—the AP Poll and the Coaches Poll.

Legend

AP Poll

Final Coaches Poll
This was the last season in which the final UPI Coaches Poll was released prior to the bowl games, in early December.
Alabama received 21 of the 34 first-place votes; Oklahoma received nine, Ohio State two, Notre Dame one, and Michigan one.

 Prior to the 1975 season, the Big Ten and Pac-8 conferences allowed only one postseason participant each, for the Rose Bowl.

References

College football rankings